Cnemaspis anamudiensis is a species of gecko found in India.

References

Reptiles of India
Endemic fauna of India
Reptiles described in 2018